Kranaia was one of the provinces of Cephalonia Prefecture of Greece. Its territory corresponded with that of the current municipal units Argostoli, Eleios-Pronnoi, Leivathos and Omala. Its seat was the town Argostoli. It was abolished in 2006.

References

Provinces of Greece